Mali–Mauritania relations refer to the interstate relations of the Republic of Mali and the Islamic Republic of Mauritania.

History 
Since Mauritania negotiated a boundary dispute with Mali in 1963, ties between the two countries have been mostly cordial. Mali and Mauritania have cooperated on several development projects, such as the OMVS and a plan to improve roads between Nouakchott and Bamako. This cooperation somewhat lessened Mali's dependence on Senegal and Côte d'Ivoire. Although relations were warm with other African states, since 1965 the orientation of Mauritania's foreign policy has been geared towards relations with North African countries.

Border crisis
Mauritanian and Malian relations arose in 2010, when French and Mauritanian forces launched a joint military operation against AQIM fighters believed to be holding a French hostage on Malian soil without the consent of the Malian government. The operation was a failure and left 7 AQIM members and 2 Mauritanian soldiers dead, with the hostage being executed. The operation was heavily criticized with it being considered to be an "unannounced declaration of war" against Mali.

Current status

References 

 
Mauritania
Bilateral relations of Mauritania